The Ven. John Francis Burnaby Lumley Lough (14 April 1832 - 20 March 1896) was Archdeacon of Bermuda from 1876  until his death.

References

1832 births
Alumni of Trinity College, Oxford
19th-century Anglican priests
1896 deaths
Archdeacons of Bermuda